Ron Mottl Jr. is a former member of the Ohio House of Representatives.

References
Ohio Lottery Commission 
Ohio Township Association 

Democratic Party members of the Ohio House of Representatives
Living people
Year of birth missing (living people)